SuperGrid is a 2018 Canadian post-apocalyptic road movie directed by Lowell Dean, who previously directed horror-comedies WolfCop and Another WolfCop. The film stars Leo Fafard, Marshall Williams, Natalie Krill, Jonathan Cherry, Amy Matysio and Jay Reso.

The film premiered at the 2018 Calgary International Film Festival.

Cast 
 Leo Fafard as Jesse
 Marshall Williams as Deke
 Natalie Krill as North
 Jonathan Cherry as Lazlo
 Amy Matysio as Spanner
 Jay Reso as Kurtis
 Tinsel Korey as Eagle
 Sheldon Bergstrom as Brezhnev

Plot
Synopsis/summary:
In a future where a plague has infected much of the population, two brothers are tasked with retrieving a mysterious package by traveling to Canada, which mining conglomerates have turned into a wasteland. Two brothers must travel the same road that claimed their sister's life in their quest to deliver mysterious cargo that they received to its proper destination. En route they must contend with road pirates, rebel gangs, and each other.

Production 

SuperGrid was filmed in the Canadian province of Saskatchewan during the summer of 2017, mainly in Regina.  Filming also took place in Grand Coulee, Lumsden Beach, Lebret and the former Sears Warehouse. Filming also occurred at the acreage of Jackie Galenzoski near Southey, Saskatchewan.

Reception 

References

External links
 

2018 films
Canadian post-apocalyptic films
English-language Canadian films
Canadian science fiction films
2018 science fiction films
2010s English-language films
Films directed by Lowell Dean
2010s Canadian films